Queso (Spanish for "cheese") may refer to:
 Chile con queso, a cheesy sauce
 Queso Records
 Queso blanco, a white cheese
 Queso Chihuahua
 Queso flameado
 an obsolete TCP/IP stack fingerprinting tool that was well known in the late 1990s
 Queso, a character from The Lingo Show, a kids' TV show
 "Queso", a 2015 song by Lil Uzi Vert from the album Luv Is Rage